= Borumand Shokri =

Iranian writer, critic, and editor

- برومند شکری
- Born: May 10, 1983 (age 43); Kermanshah, Iran
- Occupations: Writer, literary critic, journalist
- Years active: 2004–present
- Notable work: Saz va Sakhti (biography)
- Title: Editor-in-Chief of Namaname

Borumand Shokri (Persian: برومند شکری; born May 10, 1983) is an Iranian writer, literary critic, and journalist. He is the editor-in-chief of Namaname, a specialized news agency focusing on cinema and performing arts.

== Career ==
Shokri began his career in cultural journalism and biographical research. His most recognized work is Saz va Sakhti (The Instrument and the Hardship), a biography of the Iranian violinist Ghodratollah Entezami.

As the editor-in-chief of Namaname, he oversees the editorial direction of one of Iran's specialized outlets for film criticism and theater news. His literary work often explores social realism and cultural history.

== Selected works ==
=== Books ===
- Aghebat Che Khahad Shod?! (What Will Happen Eventually?!), 2004.
- Divar (The Wall), 2014.
- Azad, 2015.
- Saz va Sakhti (The Instrument and the Hardship), 2018.
- Underwater Photography (Editor), 2023.

=== Screenplays ===
- Fateme Nahid, 2015.
- Pahlavan Gol Nowruz, 2016.
